Abdul Mannan is a Bangladeshi educator. He served as the 12th chairman of University Grants Commission of Bangladesh during 2015–2019 and the vice-chancellor of the University of Chittagong during 1996–2001.

Education and career
Mannan earned his master's in Management from the University of Dhaka in 1972. He completed his graduate and post-graduate studies from the University of Hawaii and the Miami University in 1978.

Mannan started his career when he joined the Department of Management of the University of Chittagong as a lecturer in 1973. He conducted advanced research on international commerce in Ohio State University in 1989.

In 1996, Mannan became the youngest vice-chancellor of the country when was appointed at the University of Chittagong.

In 2005, Mannan took an early retirement from the University of Chittagong. He then became an Advisor to the board of trustees and a full-time Professor in the Business School of the University of Liberal Arts Bangladesh (ULAB). He also served as a professor in the Department of Business and the Dean of Faculties at the East West University.

During his term as chairman of the University Grants Commission Mannan banned Private Universities from admitting students with GED certificates in 2018.

References

Living people
People from Chittagong
University of Dhaka alumni
University of Hawaiʻi at Mānoa alumni
Miami University alumni
Vice-Chancellors of the University of Chittagong
Academic staff of the University of Chittagong
Year of birth missing (living people)
Academic staff of the University of Liberal Arts Bangladesh